Danick Vandale is a Canadian bicycle racer, currently with the H&R Block Pro Cycling team.

References

1995 births
Living people
Canadian male cyclists